Beth L. Parker is a professor at the University of Guelph known for her research on groundwater contaminants and the remediation of groundwater systems.

Education and career 
Parker has an undergraduate degree in from Allegheny College and a masters degree from Duke University. Parker began her career working in New York on industrial contaminants in groundwater, particularly in glacial and bedrock sediments. She earned her Ph.D. in 1996 from the University of Waterloo where she worked on organic liquids found in porous rocks. Following her Ph.D. she remained at the University of Waterloo as a research professor until she joined the faculty at the University of Guelph in 2007.

In 2019 Parker was elected a fellow of the American Geophysical Union who cited her "for fundamental advancement in characterizing contaminant mobility in fractured sedimentary rocks".

Research 
Parker's research centers on how diffusion impacts the movement of contaminants in groundwater, with implications for remediation of groundwater contaminants. This research includes investigations into  dense non-aqueous phase liquid (abbreviated DNAPL), or liquids that are not miscible with water. She has investigated how contaminants such as tetrachloroethylene can be tracked in groundwater and potentially removed from aquifers. Her research also includes tracking human viruses in groundwater, and the persistence of methane gas in groundwater which would be explosive if people extract groundwater containing methane from the subsurface.

Selected publications

Awards and honors 
Named Natural Sciences and Engineering Research Council of Canada Industrial Research Chair (2007)
John Hem Award, National Ground Water Association (2009)
M. King Hubbert Award, National Ground Water Association (2018)
Fellow, American Geophysical Union (2019)

References

External links 
 

Allegheny College alumni
Duke University alumni
University of Waterloo alumni
Academic staff of the University of Guelph
Living people
Fellows of the American Geophysical Union
Hydrogeologists
Women geologists
Year of birth missing (living people)